China's electric motor industry has been developed for 60 years.  Most manufacturers produce low power and small-size motors. Small motor manufacturers are mostly located in Zhejiang province, Fujian province, and Guangdong province. Only a few motor manufacturers produces high power and large-size motors, for example Wannan Motor and Sogears Motor.

High power and large-size motors are often used in rolling mills, etc. In the last, ABB and Siemens large-size motors took a large market shares in China.  However, ABB and Simens motor often have very high sale prices so that some rolling mills cannot afford.  They need domestic large-size motors instead of ABB motors.  Currently, those rolling mills can buy from domestic motor manufacturers which can produce such large-size motors.

See also 
 Economy of China

References 

Industry in China